Bonatz is a surname. Notable people with the surname include:

 Heinz Bonatz (1897–1981), German naval officer
 Karl Bonatz (1882–1951), German architect, brother of Paul
 Paul Bonatz (1877–1956), German architect

German-language surnames